Zerpa is a surname. Notable people with the surname include:

Ángel Zerpa (born 1999), Venezuelan baseball player
Carlos Zerpa (born 1950), Venezuelan painter
Fabio Zerpa (1928–2019), Uruguayan actor, parapsychologist, and UFO researcher

Spanish-language surnames